The Savur-Mohyla (Russian: Савур-могила) is a 1926 Soviet silent adventure film directed by Ivane Perestiani. It is the sequel to the 1923 film Red Devils.

Cast
 Pavel Yesikovsky as Misha  
 Sofia Jozeffi as Duniasha  
 Kador Ben-Salim as Tom Jackson  
 Svetlana Luiks as Oqsana  
 A. Bikhova as Marusya 
 Vladimir Sutyrin as Nestor Makhno
 Konstantin Ryabov as Taras  
 Lisenko as Zosim Antipych
 Patvakan Barkhudaryan as From Makhno groep 
 M. Mirzoian as From Makhno groep  
 A. Smoldovski 
 Aleksandr Gromov 
 A. Kusikov

References

Bibliography 
 Rollberg, Peter. Historical Dictionary of Russian and Soviet Cinema. Scarecrow Press, 2008.

External links 
 

1926 films
Soviet silent feature films
Georgian-language films
Films directed by Ivan Perestiani
Soviet black-and-white films
Soviet adventure films
1926 adventure films
Cultural depictions of Nestor Makhno
Silent adventure films
Soviet-era films from Georgia (country)